The American funk, rock and soul band War (originally Eric Burdon and War) has released eighteen studio albums, three live albums, seven compilation albums, and sixty singles.

Studio albums

Live albums

Compilation albums

Singles
This is a list of their USA singles; additional singles were issued in other countries.

Related albums
1970s: The Other Side of War Warms Your Heart (double LP of early instrumental tracks, credited to an early version of War comprising session men that apparently includes Brown, Dickerson and Jordan, with Bobby Womack guesting on guitar, released around 1973, though possibly not an official release)
1992: Rap Declares War (various artists, with sampling taken from War)
1997: War Stories (solo album by Lonnie Jordan, includes cover versions of six songs previously recorded by War)

References

External links
 

Discography
Discographies of American artists
Funk music discographies
Rock music group discographies
Soul music discographies